Les Shelleys was an American folk duo consisting of Tom Brosseau and Angela Correa. Both members of the duo had performed folk music independently before forming the duo in 2010. They released one studio album of the same name that year.

Track listing

References

External links

Musical groups established in 2010
Musical groups disestablished in 2010
Folk music duos
2010 albums
FatCat Records albums
2010 establishments in the United States